The Tenth Precinct Station House is an historic structure located in the Park View neighborhood of Washington, D.C. United States. The building was designed by the architectural firm of A.B. Mullett & Co. and was completed in 1905. It was constructed for Metropolitan Police Department.

It has been listed on the District of Columbia Inventory of Historic Sites and the National Register of Historic Places since 1986.

References

See also
 National Register of Historic Places listings in the Bronx
 New York City Police Department

Infrastructure completed in 1901
Government buildings on the National Register of Historic Places in Washington, D.C.